A naval militia is a reserve military organization administered under the authority of a state government in the United States.  It is often composed of reservists of the Navy Reserve, Marine Corps Reserve, and Coast Guard Reserve, retirees and volunteers. They are distinguishable from the U.S. Coast Guard Auxiliary which is a federally chartered civilian volunteer component of the U.S. Coast Guard and falls under the command of the Commandant of the Coast Guard through the Chief Director of the Auxiliary, and the United States Maritime Service and United States Merchant Marine, both of which are federal maritime services.

Under Title 10 of the United States Code, naval militias are treated differently from maritime state defense force units not primarily composed of reservists from the sea services. Naval militias are considered parts of the organized militia under federal law and thus members have a slightly different status. Naval militias, though they are state armed forces, may receive federal supplies and use Navy or Marine Corps facilities available to Naval Reserve or Marine Corps Reserve units subject to certain restrictions.

Like members of the National Guard, the Navy and Marine Reservists who constitute most of the membership in naval militias serve in a dual federal and state capacity; they operate as a component of their state's military force, and are subject to be called up and deployed by the governor of their respective states during emergencies. However, when individual sailors and marines are federalized, they are relieved from their state obligations and placed under federal control until they are released from active service.

Seamen and state marines belonging to naval militias who do not hold federal status may be enlisted or commissioned into the federal sea services at the rank they are qualified for, at the discretion of the Secretary of the Navy.

History

In the 1880s, a United States Navy proposal to organize a national Naval Reserve Force was submitted to the United States Congress, but the proposal was defeated. However, the movement to create a naval reserve force became popular at the state and local level. Following the passage of enabling legislation in several states, several of these states began establishing naval reserve forces. The first naval militia which was first organized and drilling was the Massachusetts Battalion, which first met on 28 February 1890. The New York Naval Militia was organized as a Provisional Naval Battalion in 1889, and formally became the second state naval militia when it was officially mustered into state service as the First Battalion, Naval Reserve Artillery, on 23 June 1891. Over the next few years, several other states, mainly in the eastern United States and in the Great Lakes region, created their own naval militias.

On 2 March 1891, the United States Congress passed an appropriations bill which gave the Secretary of the Navy $25,000 per year to spend on the state naval militias; this money was divided among the states based on the strength levels of the naval militias.

The naval militias were called into service during the Spanish–American War. Since no law existed to call them into federal service as a unit, governors were asked to release volunteers from their state service, and these naval militiamen were inducted into the Navy for the duration of their service during the war. New York Naval Militiamen manned two auxiliary cruisers that fought in the Battle of Santiago de Cuba, and conducted patrols of New York Harbor. Members of the North Carolina Naval Militia crewed  and guarded the city of Port Royal, South Carolina. Members of the Connecticut Naval Militia served aboard USS Minnesota. Sailors from both the Rhode Island Naval Militia and the Florida Naval Militia were also assimilated into the ranks of the Navy.

In 1914, Congress passed a bill recognizing the naval militia as a reserve component of the United States Armed Forces and reorganized them into the National Naval Volunteers. During World War I, naval militiamen were drafted into federal service. Many naval reservists, including a significant number of sailors from the Michigan Naval Militia, served in Naval Railway Battery crews on the Western Front. The primary federal responsibility of members of the naval militias was cemented by the Naval Reserve Act of 1938. In 1940, the naval militias were once again federalized to fight in World War II. Following the war, many states either did not rebuild their naval militias, or deactivated them in the years that followed.

However, several naval militias were activated or reactivated in the late 20th century and early 21st century. In 1977, the Ohio Naval Militia was reactivated. In 1984, the Alaska Naval Militia was activated. From 1999 to 2002, the New Jersey Naval Militia was reactivated after 36 years of existing only on paper.  In 2003, the South Carolina General Assembly reactivated the South Carolina Naval Militia. The New York Naval Militia is the only naval militia which has been continuously active since its creation, thereby making it the oldest naval militia.

Naval militias have been deployed multiple times in recent years to assist in national security or disaster recovery operations. In 1989, the Alaska Naval Militia was deployed to assist in recovery operations after the Exxon Valdez oil spill. On September 11, 2001, the New Jersey Naval Militia and New York Naval Militia were deployed in the immediate aftermath of the September 11 attacks to aid in emergency response efforts. The New York Naval Militia provided assistance after Hurricane Irene and Tropical Storm Lee in 2011; after Hurricane Sandy in 2012; and during the Buffalo lake effect snowstorm in 2014. In March 2020, the Alaska Naval Militia and the New York Naval Militia were activated to assist their respective states' efforts in combating the COVID-19 pandemic.

States with naval militias

Active
 Alaska Naval Militia
California State Guard Maritime Command
  New York Naval Militia
 Ohio Naval Militia
 South Carolina Naval Militia
 Texas Maritime Regiment

Authorized by statute but inactive
 Alabama
 California
 The California Naval Militia was reactivated in 1976 by the Governor of California.  Unlike New York and the few other states with ship-borne active naval militia units, the California Naval Militia is a small unit of military lawyers and strategists who provide advice and legal expertise in the field of military and naval matters for the benefit of California's state defense force.
 Connecticut Naval Militia
 District of Columbia Naval militia remains an authorized force by Federal statute, but has been inactive for several decades with no current membership.
 Florida Naval Militia
 Georgia Naval Militia

 Hawaii Naval Militia
 Illinois Naval Militia
 Indiana Naval Militia
 Louisiana Naval Militia
 Maine 
 Maryland Naval Militia
Maryland Public Safety Statute, Title 13 does not currently authorize the creation of a Naval Militia, (2015) 
 Massachusetts Naval Militia
 Michigan Naval Militia
 Minnesota Naval Militia
 Missouri Naval Militia
 New Hampshire
 New Jersey Naval Militia
 North Carolina Naval Militia
 Oregon Naval Militia
 Pennsylvania Naval Militia
 Rhode Island Naval Militia
 Tennessee
 Virginia
Washington Naval Militia
Wisconsin Naval Militia

Gallery

See also 
 United States Coast Guard Auxiliary
 Civil Air Patrol
 State Defense Forces
 United States Naval Sea Cadet Corps
 United States Power Squadrons
 
Overseas counterparts:

 Bolivarian Militia of Venezuela (People's Navy Branch)
 Estonian Defence League

References 

Militia in the United States